Jaime Delgado Aparicio (1943 – March 28, 1983) was a Peruvian jazz pianist, arranger, and conductor.

Career
He was born in Lima, Peru in 1943. He is the younger brother of lawyer and politician Luis Delgado Aparicio. He began studying piano and classical music when he was five years old. He studied at Berklee College of Music in Boston. He recorded three albums in the 1960s and performed modern jazz concerts throughout Peru into the 1980s. As music director for the record label Sono Radio, he signed the rock band Black Sugar.

Discography
 Jazz (Sono Radio, 1964)
 Jam Session Vol. 1 (Virrey, 1965)
 El Embajador Y Yo (Decibel, 1968)
 Jaime Delgado Aparicio y Su Orquesta Contemporanea (Sono Radio, 1976)

References

1943 births
1983 deaths
20th-century composers
20th-century conductors (music)
20th-century male musicians
Male jazz musicians
Musicians from Lima
Peruvian composers
Peruvian male composers
Peruvian conductors (music)
Peruvian jazz musicians